Expert Opinion on Drug Safety is a monthly peer-reviewed medical journal publishing review articles on all aspects of pharmacovigilance and original papers on the clinical implications of drug treatment safety issues. It was established in 2002 and is published by Informa. The editor-in-chief is Roger McIntyre (University of Toronto).

Abstracting and indexing 
The journal is abstracted and indexed in Chemical Abstracts, EMBASE/Excerpta Medica, Index Medicus/MEDLINE, and the Science Citation Index Expanded. According to the Journal Citation Reports, the journal has a 2017 impact factor of 3.156.

References

External links 

Pharmacology journals
Publications established in 2002
Expert Opinion journals
Monthly journals
English-language journals